Party Store is the fifth studio album by American garage rock band The Dirtbombs, released on February 1, 2011. The album was released on the In The Red Records label.

Background
Party Store is the fifth full-length LP for The Dirtbombs and their second cover album. The tracks are all covers of classic Detroit techno songs by luminaries of the genre such as Juan Atkins and Derrick May. Comparing it to their 2001 covers album Ultraglide in Black, Mick Collins has said, "The major difference … is that 'Ultraglide' was planned and 'Party Store' was not. 'Ultraglide' was an attempt to show that those were valid rock songs, that it didn’t matter what the source was — anything can be made a rock song. We had set out to prove something. 'Party Store' was actually an experiment to see if those songs could be done in a different context. 'Ultraglide' was a statement, whereas 'Party Store' was a question.

Reception

The album received a score of 70 out of 100 on Metacritic, indicating generally favorable reviews.

Track listing

References

2011 albums
The Dirtbombs albums
In the Red Records albums